Dabneys is an unincorporated community in Louisa County, Virginia, United States.

References

Unincorporated communities in Louisa County, Virginia
Unincorporated communities in Virginia